Un día cualquiera is a Mexican anthology television series that premiered on Azteca Trece on 15 August 2016, and concluded on 28 October 2016. The series is presented by Alberto Casanova as Himself. In each episode three stories are shown, of which two are true and one is false.

Cast 
 Carolina Miranda as Marilupe / Annette / Liliana (episodes, "El órgano reproductor masculino" and "Gemelos")

Episodes

References

External links 
 

2016 Mexican television series debuts
2016 Mexican television series endings
Azteca Uno original programming
Mexican anthology television series
Spanish-language television shows